Potato bush is a common name for several species of plants and may refer to:

 Solanum ellipticum, a small fast-growing waxy-looking shrub that grows next to creeks
 Solanum esuriale, a species of perennial herbaceous plant native to Australia